The Wesleyan Holiness Connection, also known as the Wesleyan Holiness Consortium, is an interdenominational organization of denominations and congregations, with membership primarily including those aligned with the Wesleyan-Holiness movement or Holiness Pentecostalism. It seeks to promote Biblical holiness in churches that historically rooted in the evangelical movement initiated by John Wesley. The Wesleyan Holiness Consortium aims to guide efforts and projects focused on holiness in the 21st century for pastors, unity within and among the participating churches, a holiness voice to the broader church, and the importance of holiness in the future mission of the church.

Member denominations
African Methodist Episcopal Church
Assemblies of God
Brethren in Christ Church
Christian & Missionary Alliance
Church of God in Christ
Church of God (Anderson, Indiana)
Church of God (Cleveland, Tennessee)
Church of the Nazarene
Free Methodist Church
Grace Communion International
International Pentecostal Holiness Church
Shield of Faith
Evangelical Church
The Foursquare Church
The Salvation Army
Wesleyan Church

See also

Global Wesleyan Alliance
Christian Holiness Partnership
Interchurch Holiness Convention

References

External links

Protestant ecumenism
Evangelical parachurch organizations
Holiness movement
Christian ecumenical organizations